Lotis (minor planet designation: 429 Lotis) is a large Main belt asteroid. It is classified as a probable C-type asteroid and is likely composed of primitive carbonaceous materials. This object was discovered by Auguste Charlois on 23 November 1897 in Nice.

In 2002, the asteroid was detected by radar from the Arecibo Observatory at a distance of 1.31 AU.

References

External links
 
 

Background asteroids
Lotis
Lotis
C-type asteroids (Tholen)
18971123